This article is about the particular significance of the year 1914 to Wales and its people.

Incumbents

Archdruid of the National Eisteddfod of Wales – Dyfed

Lord Lieutenant of Anglesey – Sir Richard Henry Williams-Bulkeley, 12th Baronet  
Lord Lieutenant of Brecknockshire – Joseph Bailey, 2nd Baron Glanusk
Lord Lieutenant of Caernarvonshire – John Ernest Greaves
Lord Lieutenant of Cardiganshire – Herbert Davies-Evans
Lord Lieutenant of Carmarthenshire – John William Gwynne Hughes 
Lord Lieutenant of Denbighshire – William Cornwallis-West    
Lord Lieutenant of Flintshire – William Glynne Charles Gladstone
Lord Lieutenant of Glamorgan – Robert Windsor-Clive, 1st Earl of Plymouth
Lord Lieutenant of Merionethshire – Sir Osmond Williams, 1st Baronet
Lord Lieutenant of Monmouthshire – Ivor Herbert, 1st Baron Treowen
Lord Lieutenant of Montgomeryshire – Sir Herbert Williams-Wynn, 7th Baronet 
Lord Lieutenant of Pembrokeshire – John Philipps, 1st Viscount St Davids 
Lord Lieutenant of Radnorshire – Powlett Milbank

Bishop of Bangor – Watkin Williams 
Bishop of Llandaff – Joshua Pritchard Hughes
Bishop of St Asaph – A. G. Edwards (later Archbishop of Wales) 
Bishop of St Davids – John Owen

Events
14 January - The first trolleybuses in Wales come into operation, in Aberdare.
23 February - Light cruiser HMS Cordelia is launched at Pembroke Dock.
11 March - A Welsh Home Rule Bill is introduced by Edward T. John, MP for East Denbighshire; it fails.
4 April - Ystradfellte Reservoir inaugurated.
2 May - South Wales Transport begins operating motorbuses in the Swansea area.
4 August - World War I: Declaration of war by the United Kingdom on the German Empire.
6 August - Pembroke Dock-built  becomes the first British naval casualty of the war when she strikes mines off the east coast.
18 September - Welsh Church Act, disestablishing the Church in Wales, receives Royal Assent, but simultaneously with the Suspensory Act which delays its coming into effect. 
21 September - William Charles Fuller wins the Victoria Cross for carrying a wounded officer to safety under fire.
14 November - Light cruiser HMS Carysfort is launched at Pembroke Dock.
unknown dates
A women's teacher training college opens at Barry; a men's equivalent opens at Caerleon.
The hundredth intermediate school in Wales is established under the Welsh Intermediate and Technical Education Act, 1889.
William James Thomas, industrialist and philanthropist, is knighted.
Pen-coed Castle is restored by D. A. Thomas, Viscount Rhondda.

Arts and literature
January - The monthly periodical Welsh Outlook is founded by Thomas Jones (T. J.).

Awards
National Eisteddfod of Wales - not held

New books
Rhoda Broughton - Concerning a Vow
Moelwyn - Caniadau Moelwyn, vol. 4
Bertrand Russell - Our Knowledge of the External World as a Field for Scientific Method in Philosophy
T. E. Ellis - Pont Orewyn

Drama
T. Gwynn Jones - Caradog yn Rhufain

Music
David John de Lloyd - Gwlad fy Nhadau (cantata)
Ivor Novello - "Keep the Home Fires Burning" 
William Rhys-Herbert - The Bo'sn's Bride (operetta based on a play by Maude Elizabeth Inch)

Film
Welsh-descended Harold Lloyd begins his film career.
Wild Wales

Sport
Boxing
26 January: Percy Jones wins the British, European and World (disputed) featherweight titles.
30 March: Jimmy Wilde wins the European flyweight title.
7 July: Freddie Welsh wins the World lightweight title
14 December: Johnny Basham wins the British welterweight title.
Rugby union
14 March: After Percy Jones is targeted by Irish players during the 1914 Five Nations Championship, Harry Uzzell leads his men in retaliation in a game notorious for its on the field violence. Wales win the match, and the Welsh pack are dubbed the 'Terrible Eight' by the press.

Births
28 January - Trefor Morgan, financier (d. 1970)
11 February - Mervyn Levy, art critic (d. 1996)
12 March - Tommy Farr, boxer (d. 1986)
12 March - Cliff Jones, Wales international rugby captain (d. 1990)
21 March - Sir Goronwy Daniel, academic and civil servant (d. 2003)
23 April - Glyn Daniel, archaeologist and television presenter (d. 1986)
18 May - Louis Ford, footballer
24 May
Sir Granville Beynon, physicist, (d. 1996)
Harry Parr Davies, composer and songwriter (d. 1955)
9 September - Alexander Cordell, novelist (d. 1997)
12 September - Desmond Llewelyn, actor (d. 1999)
22 October - David Tecwyn Lloyd, author (d. 1992)
27 October - Dylan Thomas, poet (d. 1953)
21 November - Charles Fisher, poet (d. 2006)
2 December - Russell Taylor, Wales international rugby player 
7 December - Bryan Hopkin, economist (d. 2009)
date unknown - Norah Isaac, educationalist (died 2003)

Deaths
22 February - Ivor Bertie Guest, 1st Baron Wimborne, 78
4 May - Rowland Griffiths, rugby player, 28 (typhoid)
16 June - John Hughes (Landore), composer, 42 (cerebral haemorrhage)
18 June - Abel Davies, rugby union player, 53?
21 June - Morgan Bransby Williams, engineer, 89
23 July - Harry Evans, conductor and composer, 41
8 August - Sir Edward Anwyl, academic, 48
22 August (in Swanley) - James Dickson Innes, artist, 27 (tuberculosis) 
27 August - William Lewis, 1st Baron Merthyr, 77
17 September - Shadrach Pryce, clergyman and educationalist, 81
2 October - Jack Hughes, footballer, 59
22 October - William Morgan, cricketer, 51/2
27 October - Sir T. Marchant Williams, lawyer and author, 68/9

References